Confessions of a Nice Girl is the third studio album by American country music artist Katie Armiger. It was released by Cold River Records in 2010. Three singles were released from this album in 2010: "Kiss Me Now", "Leaving Home" and "Best Song Ever", the latter of which is her best charted single to date. It peaked at number 42 on the Billboard Hot Country Songs chart in 2011. The album was re-released in late 2011 with new bonus tracks, including "I Do But Do I," which served as the album's fourth single. "Scream" was released in October 2011 as the fifth single.

Track listing
"Best Song Ever" (Katie Armiger, Amanda Flynn, Bruce Wallace) – 2:33
"Kiss Me Now" (Armiger, Sarah Buxton, Blair Daly) – 3:09
"That's Why" (Armiger, Rebecca Lynn Howard) – 4:01
"Nice Girl" (Buxton, Jeremy Stover, Brian Maher) – 2:50
"Cry, Cry, Cry" (Armiger) – 4:18
"Ain't Gonna Happen" (Rachel Proctor, Wallace) – 3:40
"I Will Be" (Armiger, Lisa McCallum) – 3:33
"Scream" (Armiger, Daly, Buxton) – 3:43
"Ain't So Sweet" (Armiger, Daly) – 3:24
"Can You Handle It" (Katrina Elam, Bonnie Baker, Jessie James) – 3:36
"Leaving Home" (Armiger, Buxton, Daly) – 3:31
"Can't Keep Myself From Loving You" (Armiger, Joe West) - 3:31
"Strong Enough" (Proctor, Wallace) - 3:43

Personnel
Credits adapted from AllMusic.

 Kurt Allison – electric guitar
 Kelly Archer – background vocals
 Katie Armiger – lead vocals, background vocals
 Mike Brignardello – bass guitar
 Nick Buda – drums
 Chad Carlson – bass guitar, acoustic guitar, electric guitar, keyboards, organ, piano, background vocals
 Eric Darken – percussion
 Howard Duck – Hammond B-3 organ, piano, strings, synthesizer
 Dan Dugmore – electric guitar, steel guitar, lap steel guitar
 Stuart Duncan – banjo, fiddle, mandolin
 Mike Durham – electric guitar
 Katrina Elam – background vocals

 Paul Franklin – steel guitar
 Kenny Greenberg – electric guitar
 Misi Hale – background vocals
 Tania Hancheroff – background vocals
 Tommy Harden – drums, percussion
 Tony Harrell – keyboards, organ, piano
 Tully Kennedy – bass guitar
 Steve King – organ
 Paul Leim – drums
 Rob McNelley – electric guitar
 Tim Marks – bass guitar
 David Monsy – bass guitar

 Gary Morse – steel guitar, lap steel guitar
 Rich Redmond – drums, percussion
 Jeff Roach – keyboards, organ, piano
 Mike Rojas – piano
 Charlie Sexton – acoustic guitar, electric guitar
 Jimmie Lee Sloas – bass guitar
 Shanna Stressberg – background vocals
 Brannen Temple – drums
 Ilya Toshinsky – banjo, acoustic guitar, mandolin
 Wanda Vick – fiddle, acoustic guitar
 Bruce Wallace – background vocals
 John Willis – acoustic guitar
 Jonathan Yudkin – string arrangements, strings

Chart performance

References

2010 albums
Katie Armiger albums
Albums produced by New Voice Entertainment